Kirsten Thomson (born 27 September 1983) is an Australian middle-distance freestyle swimmer who won a silver medal in the 4×200-metre freestyle relay at the 2000 Summer Olympics.

Coming from Sydney, New South Wales, Thomson was still attending Kirrawee High School, when under the tutelage of Doug Frost at the Sutherland club alongside Ian Thorpe when she was selected as a member of Australia's 4×200-metre relay team for the Sydney Games. Combining with Susie O'Neill, Giaan Rooney and Petria Thomas, the Australians led for the first 650 metres before being worn down by the U.S. relay team.

Thomson left the Sutherland club in 2002 after long-time coach Frost was removed from the head coaching duties when Thorpe decide to switch to the coaching of Tracy Menzies, who was then one of Frost's assistants. In 2003 Thomson, swimming with the University of Sydney club returned to the international arena, competing at the 2003 FINA World Championships in Barcelona, Spain, where she collected a silver in the 4×200-metre freestyle relay, and failed to make the final of the individual event. She missed selection for the 2004 Summer Olympics.

In February 2005 Thomson appeared in Series 10, episode 2 of Australian Story.

See also
 List of Olympic medalists in swimming (women)

References

1983 births
Living people
Sportswomen from New South Wales
Olympic swimmers of Australia
Swimmers at the 2000 Summer Olympics
Olympic silver medalists for Australia
Australian female freestyle swimmers
Swimmers from Sydney
Medalists at the 2000 Summer Olympics
Olympic silver medalists in swimming